Norman Horsley (20 August 1922 – 16 October 1994) was an English cricketer. Horsley was a right-handed batsman who bowled right-arm fast. He was born at Leicester, Leicestershire.

Horsley made his first-class debut for Nottinghamshire against Kent in the 1947 County Championship at Trent Bridge. He made two further first-class appearances in that season's County Championship, against Yorkshire and Hampshire. Playing as a bowler, he took 6 wickets in his three first-class matches at an average of 41.50, with best figures of 2/27. He was required to bat just once in his brief first-class career, where he was dismissed for a duck against Yorkshire.

He died at Louth, Lincolnshire on 16 October 1994.

References

External links
Norman Horsley at ESPNcricinfo
Norman Horsley at CricketArchive

1922 births
1994 deaths
Cricketers from Leicester
English cricketers
Nottinghamshire cricketers